Bombus funebris, the mourning bee, is a species of bumblebee found in South America west of the Andes, from Colombia to northern Chile.

Original publication
Catalogue of hymenopterous insects in the collection of the British Museum, vol. 2.

References

Bumblebees
Hymenoptera of South America
Insects described in 1854